The radial collateral ligament of the thumb extends from the first metacarpal head to the proximal phalanx of the thumb. It is located on the radial side of the joint and is weaker than the ulnar collateral ligament of the thumb.

References

Ligaments